Walter Sawall (18 July 1899 – 31 January 1953) was a German cyclist. Between 1927 and 1931 he won four medals at the UCI Motor-paced World Championships, including two gold medals in 1928 and 1931.

He left school at age 15 to help earning money for his family of eight siblings. While distributing newspapers and goods he became involved in cycling. He had his first competition in 1916 and his biggest successes around 1930. For four years he rode behind Ernest Pasquier, a French pacer, though they could not speak each other's language. Sawall retired in 1934 due to a bowel disease developed from cycling. He died in 1953 of a brain tumor. In 1932, a street in Erkner, where he lived, was named after him.

References

1899 births
1953 deaths
German male cyclists
People from Ruda Śląska
People from the Province of Silesia
UCI Track Cycling World Champions (men)
German track cyclists